The Ministry of Finance (Ottoman Turkish: Malié) was a ministry of the Ottoman Empire.

It became the late 19th century incarnation of the Defterdar (Grand Treasurer).

The modern finance ministry for Turkey is the Ministry of Finance (Turkey).

See also
 List of Ottoman Ministers of Finance

References

Ottoman Empire
Finance